In Old Norse poetry and later Icelandic poetry, a lausavísa (pl. lausavísur) is a single stanza composition, or a set of stanzas unconnected by narrative or thematic continuity.

Lausavísur are often introduced in the text of sagas with the phrase þá kvað (then said).

References
 Carmina Scaldica

External links 

 Skaldic Poetry Project - Anonymous lausavísa from Ágrip af Nóregskonunga sǫgum

Skaldic poetry